Sugarbird is Paul Reddick's second solo album. Reddick previously recorded four albums with The Sidemen, a blues band based out of Toronto.

Track listing

Musicians

Tracks 5, 6 & 7
Paul Reddick: Vocal, Harmonica
Colin Linden: Guitars
John Whynot: Piano
Hutch Hutchinson: Bass
Stephen Hodges: Drums, Percussion, Tubular Bells
Darrell Leonard: Trumpet/Horn Arrangements
Joe Sublette: Saxophone
Jim McMillen: Saxophone
Jim Thompson: Trombone

Tracks 3, 4 & 12
Paul Reddick: Vocal, Harmonica
Colin Linden: Guitars, Banjo, Electric Bass, Baritone Guitar
Bryan Owings: Drums
Dave Roe: Upright Bass (Tracks 3 & 12)
Chris Carmichael: Strings (Track 4)

Tracks 1, 8 & 10
Paul Reddick: Vocal, Harmonica
Colin Linden: 12-String Guitar, National Steel Guitar
Garth Hudson: Accordion

Tracks 2, 9 & 11
Paul Reddick: Vocal, Harmonica
Colin Linden: Guitars, Harmonies
John Dymond: Bass
Gary Craig: Drums
Chris Carmichael: Strings (Track 11)
Bryan Owings: Drums (Track 2)

Production
Produced by Colin Linden
Recorded by Colin Linden, John Whynot, George Seara, Justin Puig and Chris Carmichael at Pinhead Recorders (Toronta and Nashville), Phase One Studios (Toronto), Levon Helm Studio (Woodstock, NY), Sound City Studio (Los Angeles)
Mixed by Colin Linden at Pinhead Recorders (Toronto)
Mastered by John Whynot
Illustration: Mango Hummingbird, Audubon  Centennial Edition, Audubon Arts, West Palm Beach, FL
Photography: Koko Bonaparte, Alan Messer, iStock
Design: Compass360 Design & Advertising
All track information and credits were taken from the CD liner notes.

References

External links
Paul Reddick Official Site
NorthernBlues Music Official Site

2008 albums
Blues albums by Canadian artists